Annual Bulletin may refer to:

Annual Bulletin (Comparative Law Bureau) (1908–1914, 1933)
Annual Bulletin of Historical Literature, from 1912, of the Historical Association
Annual Bulletin of the National Gallery of Victoria 1959–1966

See also

Bulletin (disambiguation)